Holy Trinity Church may refer to:

Albania
 Holy Trinity Church (Berat), Berat County
 Holy Trinity Church, Lavdar, Opar, Korçë County

Armenia
 Holy Trinity Church, Yerevan

Australia

 Garrison Church, Sydney, South Wales, also known as Holy Trinity Garrison Church
 Holy Trinity Anglican Church, Berrima, New South Wales
 Holy Trinity Anglican Church, Herberton, Queensland
 Holy Trinity Anglican Church, Woolloongabba, Brisbane, Queensland
 Holy Trinity Church, Fortitude Valley, Brisbane, Queensland
 Holy Trinity Church, Mackay, Queensland
 Holy Trinity Parish Hall, Fortitude Valley
 Holy Trinity Rectory, Fortitude Valley
 Holy Trinity Church, Adelaide, South Australia
 Holy Trinity Church, North Hobart, Tasmania
 Holy Trinity Church, Bacchus Marsh, Victoria
 Holy Trinity Anglican Church, Roebourne, Western Australia
 Holy Trinity Church, York, Western Australia
 Lutheran Trinity Church, East Melbourne, Victoria

Austria 
 Holy Trinity Church, Salzburg

Bulgaria
 Church of the Holy Trinity, Svishtov

Canada
 Cathedral of the Holy Trinity (Quebec)
 Church of the Holy Trinity (Toronto)
 Holy Trinity Anglican Church (Alma, Prince Edward Island)
 Holy Trinity Anglican Church (Maple Grove, Quebec)
 Holy Trinity Anglican Church (Stanley Mission, Saskatchewan)

China
 Holy Trinity Church, Shanghai

Czech Republic
 Holy Trinity Church, Fulnek
 Holy Trinity Church, Opočno

Finland
 Holy Trinity Church, Helsinki

France
 Abbey of Sainte-Trinité, Caen, in the Abbaye aux Dames
 Holy Trinity Church, Ajaccio, Corsica
 Sainte-Trinité, Paris

Germany 
 Holy Trinity Church, Bad Berneck
 Holy Trinity Church, Berlin (Dreifaltigkeitskirche)

Hong Kong 
 Holy Trinity Church, Kowloon, consecrated a cathedral in 2010

India

 Holy Trinity Church, Bangalore, Karnataka
 The Holy Trinity Church, Changanacherry, Kerala
 Holy Trinity Church, Powai, Mumbai, Maharashtra
 Holy Trinity Church, Ooty, Tamil Nadu
 Holy Trinity Church, Yercaud, Tamil Nadu
 Holy Trinity Church, Bolarum, Secunderabad, Telangana

Ireland
 Holy Trinity Church, Cork, County Cork
 Holy Trinity Church, Templebreedy, County Cork

Italy
 see Santissima Trinità (disambiguation)

Lithuania
 Church of the Holy Trinity, Panevėžys

Malta
 Church of the Holy Trinity, Sliema
 Trinity Church, Marsa

Mongolia
 Holy Trinity Church, Ulaanbaatar

New Zealand
 Holy Trinity Avonside, Christchurch
 Holy Trinity Church, New Plymouth
 Holy Trinity Church, Port Chalmers

Poland
 Holy Trinity Church, Strzelno
 Holy Trinity Church, Warsaw

Puerto Rico
 Iglesia de la Santísima Trinidad, Ponce, Puerto Rico

Romania
 Holy Trinity Churches, Alba Iulia
 Holy Trinity Church, Dârste, Brașov
 Holy Trinity Greek Church, Brașov
 Holy Trinity Church, Oradea
 Holy Trinity Church, Sighișoara

Russia
 Holy Trinity Church, Tobolsk

Serbia 

 Cathedral of the Holy Trinity

Singapore
 Church of the Holy Trinity, Singapore

Slovakia
 Church of Holy Trinity, Mošovce
 Most Holy Trinity Church, Tvrdošín
Holy Trinity Church (Žilina)

Slovenia
 Holy Trinity Church (Hrastovlje)

Spain
 Holy Trinity Church (Guardamar del Segura)

Sri Lanka
 Holy Trinity Church, Nuwara Eliya

Sweden
 Trinity Church, Kristianstad

Syria
 Holy Trinity Church, Aleppo

Turkey
 Holy Trinity Church, Eskişehir
 Holy Trinity Church, Sivrihisar

Ukraine
 Gate Church of the Trinity (Pechersk Lavra), Kiev
 Holy Trinity Church, Kamianets-Podilskyi
 Holy Trinity Church, Zhovkva

United Arab Emirates
 Holy Trinity Church, Dubai

United Kingdom

England

Berkshire
 Holy Trinity Church, Reading
 Holy Trinity Church, Theale

Bristol
 Holy Trinity Church, Lawrence Hill (now the Trinity Centre)
 Holy Trinity Church, Westbury on Trym

Buckinghamshire
 Holy Trinity Church, Bledlow

Cambridgeshire
 Holy Trinity Church, Balsham
 Holy Trinity Church, Cambridge

Cheshire
 Holy Trinity Church, Bickerton
 Holy Trinity Church, Capenhurst
 Holy Trinity Chapel, Capesthorne
 Holy Trinity Church, Chester (now the Guildhall)
 Holy Trinity Church, Hurdsfield
 Holy Trinity Church, Northwich
 Holy Trinity Church, Rainow
 Holy Trinity Church, Runcorn
 Holy Trinity Church, Warrington

Cornwall
 Holy Trinity Church, St Austell

Cumbria
 Holy Trinity Church, Brathay
 Holy Trinity Church, Casterton
 Holy Trinity Church, Colton
 Holy Trinity Church, Howgill
 Church of Holy Trinity and St George, Kendal (the town's Roman Catholic parish church)
 Kendal Parish Church, also known as Holy Trinity Church (the town's Anglican parish church)
 Holy Trinity Church, Millom
 Holy Trinity Church, Seathwaite
 Holy Trinity Church, Ulverston

Derbyshire
 Holy Trinity Church, Ashford-in-the-Water
 Holy Trinity Church, Chesterfield
 Holy Trinity Church, Derby
 Holy Trinity Church, Kirk Ireton
 Holy Trinity Church, Stanton-in-Peak

Dorset
 Holy Trinity Church, Bothenhampton
 Holy Trinity Church, Dorchester

Devon
 Holy Trinity Church, Exmouth
 Holy Trinity Church, Torbryan

Durham
 Holy Trinity Church, Sunderland
 Holy Trinity Church, Thorpe Thewles

East Riding of Yorkshire
 Hull Minster, known as Holy Trinity Church until 2017

East Sussex
 Holy Trinity Church, Brighton
 Holy Trinity Church, Hastings
 Holy Trinity Church, Hove

Essex
 Holy Trinity Church, Halstead
 Holy Trinity Church, Southchurch

Gloucestershire
 Holy Trinity Church, Kingswood

Greater Manchester
 Holy Trinity Church, Bolton
 Holy Trinity Church, Bury
 Holy Trinity Church, Horwich
 Holy Trinity Platt Church, Rusholme, Manchester

Hampshire
 Holy Trinity Church, Aldershot
 Holy Trinity Church, Millbrook
 Holy Trinity Church, Privett
 Holy Trinity Church, Winchester

Hertfordshire
 Holy Trinity Church, Weston

Isle of Wight
 Holy Trinity Church, Bembridge
 Holy Trinity Church, Cowes
 Holy Trinity Church, Ryde
 Holy Trinity Church, Ventnor

Kent
 Holy Trinity Church, Coxheath
 Holy Trinity Church, East Peckham
 Holy Trinity Church, Tunbridge Wells (now Trinity Theatre)

Lancashire
 Holy Trinity Church, Blackburn
 Holy Trinity Church, Blackpool
 Holy Trinity Church, Bolton-le-Sands
 Holy Trinity Church, Burnley
 Holy Trinity Church, Hoghton
 Holy Trinity Church, Morecambe
 Holy Trinity Church, Tarleton
 Holy Trinity Church, Wray

Leicestershire
 Holy Trinity Church, Ashby-de-la-Zouch
 Holy Trinity Church, Leicester

Lincolnshire
Church of Holy Trinity, Barrow upon Humber

London
 Holy Trinity Brompton
 Holy Trinity Church, Canning Town
 Holy Trinity Church, Clapham
 Holy Trinity Church, Dalston
 Holy Trinity Church, Marylebone
 Holy Trinity, Sloane Street
 Holy Trinity Church, South Kensington
 Holy Trinity Church, Tulse Hill

Merseyside
 Holy Trinity Church, Hoylake
 Holy Trinity Church, Southport
 Holy Trinity Church, Wavertree, Liverpool

Northamptonshire
 Holy Trinity Church, Blatherwycke

North Yorkshire
 Holy Trinity Church, Coverham
 Holy Trinity Church, Goodramgate, York
 Holy Trinity Church, King's Court, demolished church in York
 Holy Trinity Church, Little Ouseburn
 Holy Trinity Church, Micklegate, York
 St James with Holy Trinity Church, Scarborough
 Holy Trinity Church, Skipton
 Holy Trinity Church, Wensley

Nottinghamshire
 Holy Trinity Church, Besthorpe
 Holy Trinity Church, Bulcote
 Holy Trinity Church, Everton
 Holy Trinity Church, Kirton
 Holy Trinity Church, Lambley
 Holy Trinity Church, Lenton
 Holy Trinity Church, Ratcliffe-on-Soar
 Holy Trinity Church, Rolleston
 Holy Trinity Church, Southwell
 Holy Trinity Church, Trinity Square, Nottingham (demolished 1958)
 Holy Trinity Church, Tythby
 Holy Trinity Church, Wysall

Oxfordshire
 Holy Trinity Church, Chipping Norton
 Holy Trinity Church, Headington Quarry

Shropshire
 Holy Trinity Church, Holdgate

Sierra Leone
 Holy Trinity Church, Freetown

Somerset
 Holy Trinity Church, Abbots Leigh
 Church of the Holy Trinity, Long Sutton
 Holy Trinity Church, Norton Malreward
 Church of the Holy Trinity, Paulton

South Yorkshire
 Holy Trinity Church, Thurgoland, Thurgoland
 Old Holy Trinity Church, Wentworth

Staffordshire
 Holy Trinity Church, Eccleshall
 Holy Trinity Church, Newcastle-under-Lyme
Stockton-On-Tees

 Holy Trinity Church, Stockton-On-Tees

Suffolk
 Holy Trinity Church, Blythburgh
 Holy Trinity Church, Long Melford
 Holy Trinity Church, Nailsea

Surrey
 Holy Trinity Church, Guildford

Tyne and Wear
 Holy Trinity Church, Sunderland

Warwickshire
 Holy Trinity Church, Leamington Spa
 Church of the Holy Trinity, Stratford-upon-Avon, William Shakespeare's burial site

West Midlands
 Holy Trinity Church, Birchfield, Birmingham
 Holy Trinity Church, Bordesley, Birmingham
 Holy Trinity Church, Coventry
 Holy Trinity Church, Heath Town, Wolverhampton
 Holy Trinity Church, Sutton Coldfield, Birmingham

West Sussex
 Holy Trinity Church, Bosham
 Holy Trinity Church, Cuckfield
 Holy Trinity Church, Rudgwick

West Yorkshire
 Holy Trinity Church, Bingley
 Holy Trinity Church, Bradford
 Holy Trinity Church, Huddersfield
 Holy Trinity Church, Leeds
 Holy Trinity Church, Rothwell

Wiltshire
 Holy Trinity Church, Trowbridge

Worcestershire
 Holy Trinity Church, Lickey
 Holy Trinity Church, Malvern Link

York
 Holy Trinity Church, Goodramgate, York
 Holy Trinity Church, Micklegate, York

Scotland
 Holy Trinity Church, Spynie, Moray
 Holy Trinity Church, Melrose, Scottish Borders

Wales
 Holy Trinity Church, Greenfield, Flintshire
 Holy Trinity Church, Sarn, Powys

United States

 Holy Trinity Church (Juneau, Alaska)
 Holy Trinity Church, Fresno, California
 Holy Trinity Church (Trinidad, California)
 Holy Trinity Roman Catholic Church (Hartford, Connecticut)
 Church of the Holy Trinity and Rectory (Middletown, Connecticut)
 Holy Trinity Church (Old Swedes), in New Castle County, Delaware
 Holy Trinity Catholic Church (Washington, D.C.)
 Holy Trinity Episcopal Church (Melbourne, Florida)
 Holy Trinity Episcopal Church Parish (Melbourne, Florida)
 Holy Trinity Catholic Church (Honolulu), Hawaii
 Holy Trinity Church Rectory and Convent, Bloomington, Illinois
 Holy Trinity Roman Catholic Church (Chicago), Illinois
 Holy Trinity Catholic Church (Shreveport, Louisiana)
 Holy Trinity Episcopal Church (Bowie, Maryland)
 Church of the Holy Trinity (Churchville, Maryland)
 Holy Trinity Episcopal Church (Luverne, Minnesota)
 Church of the Holy Trinity (Rollingstone, Minnesota)
 Church of the Holy Trinity (Vicksburg, Mississippi)
 Most Holy Trinity Church, Mamaroneck, New York
 Holy Trinity Church (Manhattan), New York City
 Holy Trinity Church, St. Christopher House and Parsonage, Manhattan, New York City
 Holy Trinity Roman Catholic Church Complex (Niagara Falls, New York)
 Church of the Holy Trinity (Hertford, North Carolina)
 Holy Trinity Anglican Church (Raleigh, North Carolina)
 Holy Trinity Church (Cincinnati, Ohio)
 Church of the Holy Trinity, Philadelphia, Pennsylvania
 Holy Trinity Church (Central Falls, Rhode Island)
 Church of the Holy Trinity (Ridgeland, South Carolina)
 Holy Trinity Church (Kimball, South Dakota)
 Holy Trinity Church (Nashville), Tennessee
 Holy Trinity Roman Catholic Church (Milwaukee, Wisconsin)

Other uses 
 Church of the Holy Trinity v. United States (1892), U.S. Supreme Court case

See also
 Trinity Church (disambiguation)
 Dreifaltigkeitskirche (disambiguation)
 Holy Trinity Anglican Church (disambiguation)
 Holy Trinity Cathedral (disambiguation)
 Holy Trinity Episcopal Church (disambiguation)
 Holy Trinity Greek Orthodox Church (disambiguation)
 Holy Trinity Lutheran Church (disambiguation)